Cherukuri Ramoji Rao (born 16 November 1936) is an Indian businessman, media entrepreneur, and film producer. He is head of the Ramoji Group which owns the world's largest film production facility Ramoji Film City, Eenadu newspaper, ETV Network of TV channels, film production company Usha Kiran Movies. His other business ventures include Margadarsi Chit Fund, Dolphin Group of hotels, Kalanjali shopping mall, Priya pickles, and Mayuri Film Distributors.

He has garnered four Filmfare Awards South, five Nandi Awards and the National Film Award for his works in Telugu cinema. In 2016, he was honored with the Padma Vibhushan, India's second-highest civilian honor, for his contributions in journalism, literature and education.

Personal life
Cherukuri Ramoji Rao was born on 16 November 1936 in Pedaparupudi of Krishna District, Andhra Pradesh, India into an agricultural family. Companies owned by the Ramoji Group include Margadarsi Chit Fund, Eenadu newspaper, ETV Network, Ramadevi Public School, Priya Foods, Kalanjali, Ushakiran Movies and the Ramoji Film City near Hyderabad. He is also the chairman of Dolphin Group of Hotels in Andhra Pradesh.

Rao's younger son, Cherukuri Suman, died of leukemia on 7 September 2012.

Filmography
{| class="wikitable sortable"
|-
! Year !! Film title !!  Language !! class=unsortable| Cast !! class=unsortable| Director !! class=unsortable| Notes
|-
| 1984|| Srivariki Premalekha||Telugu ||Naresh, Poornima||Jandhyala||
|-
| 1984|| Kanchana Ganga||Telugu ||Chandra Mohan, Saritha, Swapna, Sarath Babu||V. Madhusudhana Rao||
|-
| 1984|| Sundari Subbarao ||Telugu ||Chandra Mohan, Vijayshanti||Relangi Narasimha Rao||
|-
| 1985|| Mayuri||Telugu ||Sudha Chandran, Subhakar||Singeetam Srinivasa Rao||Remade in Hindi as Naache Mayuri; dubbed into Malayalam and Tamil as Mayoori
|-
| 1985|| Pratighatana||Telugu||Vijayshanti, Chandra Mohan||T. Krishna||Remade in Malayalam as Pakarathinu Pakaram and Hindi as Pratighaat
|-
| 1985|| Preminchu Pelladu||Telugu||Rajendra Prasad, Bhanupriya ||Vamsy||
|-
| 1986|| Pakarathinu Pakaram||Malayalam ||||T. Krishna||Remake of Pratighatana
|-
| 1986|| Mallemoggalu||Telugu||Sagarika, Rajesh||V. Madhusudhana Rao||
|-
| 1986|| Car Diddina Kapuram||Telugu||Rajendra Prasad, Pavitra||D.V. Narasa Raju||
|-
| 1986|| Naache Mayuri||Hindi ||Sudha Chandran, Shekhar Suman||T. Rama Rao||Remake of Mayuri
|-
| 1987|| Chandamama Rave||Telugu||Chandra Mohan, Kalpana||Moulee||
|-
| 1987|| Pratighaat|| ||Sujata Mehta||N. Chandra||Remake of Pratighatana
|-
| 1987|| Premayanam||Telugu ||Naresh, Jayashree||C. V. Sridhar||
|-
| 1988|| O Bharya Katha||Telugu ||Jayasudha, Chandra Mohan, Sarath Babu||Moulee||
|-
| 1989|| Mouna Poratam||Telugu ||Yamuna, Vinod Kumar||Mohan Gandhi||
|-
| 1989|| Paila Pacheesu||Telugu ||Rajendra Prasad, Ramya Krishna, Brahmanandam ||Moulee||
|-
| 1990|| Judgement||Telugu ||Siva Krishna, Vinod Kumar, Yamuna, Aruna||A.Mohan Gandhi||
|-
| 1990|| Mamasri||Telugu ||Suresh, Ramyakrishna, Liji, Anand||Sharath||
|-
| 1990|| Manasu Mamata ||Telugu ||Naresh, Sithara||Moulee||
|-
| 1991|| Amma||Telugu ||Suhasini,Sarathbabu, Baby Sunayana||Suresh Krissna||
|-
| 1991|| Aswini||Telugu ||Bhanu Chander, Ashwini Nachappa||Moulee||
|-
| 1991|| People's Encounter||Telugu ||Meka Srikanth, Vinod kumar, Bhanupriya||Mohan Gandhi||
|-
| 1991|| Jagannatham & Sons||Telugu ||Suresh, Sindhuja||Anil Kumar||
|-
| 1992|| Vasundhara||Telugu ||Sithara ||Suresh Krissna||
|-
| 1998|| Padutha Theeyaga||Telugu||Vineeth, Heera Rajagopal||Kranthi Kumar||
|-
| 1998|| Daddy Daddy||Telugu||ANR, Jayasudha, Harish, Raasi||Kodi Ramakrishna||
|-
| 1999|| Mechanic Mamaiah'||Telugu||Rajasekhar, Rambha||S. V. Rajendra Singh Babu||
|-
| 2000|| Subhavela||Telugu||Ravi Kanth, Anasuya||Ramana||
|-
| 2000|| Chitram||Telugu||Uday Kiran, Reema Sen||Teja||Remade in Kannada as Chitra|-
| 2000|| Moodu Mukkalaata||Telugu||Jagapati Babu, Soundarya, Rambha, Raasi ||K. Raghavendra Rao||
|-
| 2000|| Nuvve Kavali||Telugu||Tarun Kumar, Richa Pallod||K. Vijaya Bhaskar||Remake of Niram; remade in Hindi as Tujhe Meri Kasam and Kannada as Ninagagi|-
| 2000||  Dr. Munshir Diary||Bengali||Sabyasachi Chakraborty, Saswata Chatterjee, Bibhu Bhattacharya||Sandip Ray|| Feluda Telefilm
|-
| 2001|| Deevinchandi||Telugu||	Srikanth, Raasi, Malavika||Muthyala Subbaiah||
|-
| 2001|| Ninnu Choodalani||Telugu||Jr. NTR, Raveena Rajput||V. R. Pratap||
|-
| 2001|| Akasa Veedhilo||Telugu||Nagarjuna, Rajendra Prasad, Raveena Tandon, Kasthuri||Singeetam Srinivasa Rao||
|-
| 2001|| Chitra ||Kannada||Nagendra Prasad, Rekha Vedavyas||Dinesh Baboo ||Remake of Chitram|-
| 2001|| Anandam||Telugu||Aakash, Rekha Vedavyas, Venkat, Tanu Roy||Srinu Vaitla||Remade in Tamil as Inidhu Inidhu Kadhal Inidhu|-
| 2001 || Ananda ||Kannada||Naveen Mayur|| ||Remake of Telugu film Anandam|-
| 2001|| Ishtam||Telugu||Charan, Shriya Saran||Vikram Kumar & Raj Kumar||
|-
| 2002|| Manasuvunte Chalu||Telugu||Sai Kiran, Jennifer Kotwal, Sivaji||Jonnalagadda Sreenivasa Rao||
|-
| 2002|| Priya Nesthama||Telugu||Venu Thottempudi, Shanu||R. Ganapathi||
|-
| 2002|| Neetho||Telugu|| Prakash Kovelamudi, Mahek Chahal||John Mahendran||
|-
| 2002|| Ninagagi||Kannada||Vijay Raghavendra, Radhika||S. Mahendar||Remake of Nuvve Kavali|-
| 2003|| Tujhe Meri Kasam||Hindi|| Ritesh Deshmukh, Genelia Deshmukh||K. Vijaya Bhaskar||Remake of Nuvve Kavali|-
| 2003|| Oka Raju Oka Rani||Telugu||Ravi Teja, Namitha||Yogie||
|-
| 2003|| Toli Choopulone||Telugu||Nandamuri Kalyan Ram, Akanksha||Y. Kasi Viswanath||
|-
| 2003|| Inidhu Inidhu Kadhal Inidhu||Tamil ||Jai Akash, Neha||Sakthi Chidambaram||Remake of Anandam|-
| 2003|| Bombaiyer Bombete||Bengali||Sabyasachi Chakraborty, Parambrata Chatterjee, Bibhu Bhattacharya||Sandip Ray|| Feluda Film
|-
| 2004|| Anandamanandamaye||Telugu||Jai Akash, Renuka Menon||Srinu Vaitla||
|-
| 2004|| Thoda Tum Badlo Thoda Hum||Hindi|| Arya Babbar, Shriya Saran|| Esmayeel Shroff||
|-
| 2006|| Veedhi||Telugu||Sharwanand, Gopika||V. Dorairaj||
|-
| 2007|| Sixer||Kannada||Prajwal Devaraj, Devaki||Shashank||
|-
| 2008|| Nachavule||Telugu||Tanish, Maadhavi Latha||Ravi Babu||
|-
| 2009|| Ninnu Kalisaka||Telugu||Santosh Samrat, Chaitanya Krishna, Dipa Shah, Piaa Bajpai, Jagapati Babu||Siva Nageswara Rao ||
|-
| 2009|| Savaari||Kannada||Srinagar Kitty, Raghu Mukherjee, Kamalini Mukherjee, Suman Ranganathan||Jacob Verghese||Remake of Gamyam; co-production with Arka Media Works
|-
| 2010|| Betting Bangaraju||Telugu||Allari Naresh, Nidhi||E.Sattibabu||
|-
| 2011|| Nuvvila||Telugu||Avish, Ajay, Prasad Barve, Vijay Sai, Yami Gautam, Sarayu, Remya Nambeesan||Ravi Babu||
|-
| 2015|| Beeruva||Telugu||Sundeep Kishan, Surabhi ||Kanmani||Co-production with Anandi Art Creations
|-
| 2015|| Dagudumootha Dandakor||Telugu||Rajendra Prasad, Sara Arjun||R.K Malineni ||Remake of Saivam; co-production with First Frame Entertainment
|}

Awards and honours

Civilian honours
Padma Vibhushan (2016) – Government of India

National Film Awards
National Film Award for Best Feature Film in Telugu (producer) – Nuvve Kavali (2000)

Filmfare Awards
Filmfare Best Film Award (Telugu) – Pratighatana (1985)
Filmfare Special Award - South for outstanding contributions towards Indian cinema (1998)
Filmfare Best Film Award (Telugu) – Nuvve Kavali'' (2000)
Filmfare Lifetime Achievement Award - South (2004)

Nandi Awards
Best Feature Film -  Silver - Kanchana Ganga (1984)
Best Feature Film - Gold - Mayuri (1985)
Best Feature Film - Silver - Mouna Poratam (1989)
Best Feature Film - Bronze - Aswini (1991)
Best Childrens Film - Gold - Teja (1992)

References

External links
 

1936 births
Living people
Telugu film producers
Recipients of the Padma Vibhushan in literature & education
Film producers from Andhra Pradesh
Filmfare Awards South winners
Indian mass media owners
People from Krishna district
20th-century Indian businesspeople
21st-century Indian businesspeople
Indian film distributors
Businesspeople from Andhra Pradesh
Ramoji Group